David Barry Freeman (born 25 November 1979) is an Irish former footballer who played as a striker or in central-midfield; he now works as a coach at Burton Albion.

He began his career in England with Nottingham Forest in 1998, and had a loan spell at Port Vale in 2000. He had a brief spell with Carlisle United and Ilkeston Town in 2002 and 2003, before he returned to Ireland to play for St Patrick's Athletic. He helped the club to the League of Ireland Cup, before he signed with Drogheda United in 2004. The next year he moved on to Dublin City, before he joined Longford Town in 2006. He switched to Shelbourne in 2008, before he arrived at Monaghan United in 2009. He returned to Longford Town in 2010, before he finished his career with Drogheda United in 2011.

Playing career
Freeman began his career in England with Nottingham Forest, joining the club in 1996. Freeman went on to sign professional terms with the former European champions but only made limited appearances during his tenure at the City Ground. He also had a loan spell with Port Vale in 2000 during his time at Forest. Despite early promise, Freeman was released by Forest in 2002, a knee injury had restricted the already limited opportunities he had to impress the Forest management. Freeman went on to have short spells with Carlisle United and Ilkeston Town before returning to Ireland by signing for St Patrick's Athletic in 2003.

Freeman spent one season with the "Saints", but his sole season will largely remembered for scoring the winning goal for Pats in the 2003 League of Ireland Cup Final against Longford Town. Freeman also made an appearance for the Saints in that seasons FAI Cup final, a match Pats lost to Longford Town. Freeman joined Drogheda United for the 2004 season on a professional contract and became a regular figure for the Drogs". The 2005 season though saw Freeman struggle to retain his regular place in the "Drogs" first team and as a result, Freeman joined First Division promotion contenders Dublin City in July 2005, initially on loan. Freeman went on to sign permanently for the "Vikings" and was instrumental in their successful promotion that season. Freeman began the 2006 season back in the Premier Division with Dublin City, but City folded in July 2006 due to financial difficulties. As a result, Freeman became a free agent and would soon sign for Longford Town. Freeman became a regular figure in the Longford team but struggled to find the back of the net only scoring two goals for the Flancare Park club. Freeman's 2007 campaign was prematurely halted by the diagnosis of a heart condition. He did not play again that season and he departed Longford at the end of that season. Freeman signed for Shelbourne in December 2007 on condition of receiving the all-clear from his medics.

Freeman made his Shelbourne debut in a scoreless draw against Dundalk at Tolka Park on 7 March 2008. He scored his first Shelbourne goal a week later during a 3–1 victory over Kildare County at Station Road on 14 March 2008. He finished as a First Division runner-up with "Shels" in the 2008 season and he made 31 league and cup appearances, scoring eight goals in the process. Freeman departed Shels at the end of the season to join Monaghan United on 27 January 2009. Freeman re-joined Longford Town in January 2010, but was released at the end of the 2010 season. He returned to another former club, Drogheda United, for their 2011 Premier Division campaign.

Coaching career
Freeman worked at the academy at Burton Albion, before he was taken on as a full-time academy staff member in July 2017.

Career statistics
Source:

Honours
St. Patrick's Athletic
League of Ireland Cup: 2003
FAI Cup runner-up: 2003

Dublin City
League of Ireland First Division second-place promotion: 2005

Shelbourne
League of Ireland First Division second-place promotion: 2008

References

Living people
1979 births
Association footballers from Dublin (city)
Association football midfielders
Association football forwards
Republic of Ireland association footballers
Republic of Ireland expatriate association footballers
Republic of Ireland youth international footballers
Cherry Orchard F.C. players
Expatriate footballers in England
Nottingham Forest F.C. players
Port Vale F.C. players
Carlisle United F.C. players
Ilkeston Town F.C. (1945) players
St Patrick's Athletic F.C. players
Drogheda United F.C. players
Dublin City F.C. players
Longford Town F.C. players
Shelbourne F.C. players
Monaghan United F.C. players
English Football League players
League of Ireland players
Association football coaches
Burton Albion F.C. non-playing staff